Hypnodendron vitiense, commonly known as palm moss or palm tree moss, is a ground moss which can be divided into two varieties: Hypnodendron vitiense var. vitiense and Hypnodendron vitiense var. australe. Distributed in Australia, Asia, and Oceania. The plant is commonly located in shaded wet forests and rainforests.

See also 
 Hypnodendron comosum

References

Bryophyta of Australia
Bryopsida